Bleasdalea is a genus of flowering plants in the family Proteaceae.

Taxonomy
Molecular and morphological analysis shows this genus is most closely related to the genus Hicksbeachia, ancestors of the two genera having diverged around 15 million years ago in the Miocene.

Species
The genus comprises two species which are native to north-east Australia and New Guinea:

Bleasdalea bleasdalei
Bleasdalea papuana (Diels) Domin

References

 
Proteaceae genera
Proteales of Australia
Taxonomy articles created by Polbot
Flora of New Guinea